The 1998 National Soccer League Grand Final was held on 16 May 1998 between South Melbourne and Carlton SC at Olympic Park Stadium. South Melbourne gained home advantage as they won the major semi-final against them two weeks prior. John Anastasiadis scored in the ninth minute for South Melbourne as they went up 1–0 at the half time break. In the 78th minute, Marcus Stergiopoulos netted a goal for Carlton to equalise, however, an 87th minute winner from Con Boutsianis clinched the victory for South Melbourne, gifting them their third NSL championship. Fausto De Amicis won the Joe Marston Medal.

Route to the final

League Standings

Finals Bracket

Match

Details

References 

1998 in Australian soccer
NSL Grand Finals
Soccer in Melbourne
South Melbourne FC matches
Carlton SC matches